Andrey Bezrukov, often referred to by his cover name Donald Heathfield, is former KGB sleeper agent. He had served as both a KGB and SVR operative until his disclosure in the United States in 2010. His wife, Elena Stanislavovna Vavilova, often referred to by her cover name Tracey Foley, is also a former KGB sleeper agent.

Biography
Andrei Olegovich Bezrukov was born on 30 August 1960 in Kansk, Krasnoyarsk Krai.  From 1978 to 1983 he studied at Tomsk State University with a degree in history, where he met his future wife.

Under the assumed name of Donald Howard Heathfield, together with his wife Elena Vavilova, he lived in several nations outside of the Soviet Union for more than 20 years, engaged in illegal intelligence activities. According to his undercover identity, Heathfield was the son of a Canadian diplomat, who actually died in 1962 at the age of 7 weeks, and graduated from high school in the Czech Republic. A classmate from Harvard noted that Heathfield kept up to date regarding the lives of his classmates, including future Mexican President Felipe Calderon.

From 1992 to 1995 he studied in Canada, at York University where he graduated with a bachelor's degree in international economics. From 1995 to 1997, he studied at the École nationale des ponts et chaussées, receiving a master's degree in international business. From 1999 onwards, he lived in the United States. In 2000, he graduated from the John F. Kennedy School of Government with a master's degree in public administration.

From May 2000 to May 2006 he worked as a partner in the consulting company Global Partners Inc., whose clients were well-known companies such as Alstom, Boston Scientific, General Electric and T-Mobile. From May 2006 to December 2010, he headed another consulting company, Future Map, specializing in government and corporate strategic forecasting and planning systems, which had branches in Paris and Singapore. Bezrukov was a member of the World Future Society, an organization once described by the Boston Herald as "a factory of thought for new technologies, at a conference of which leading experts in the field of public administration come together". Because of this, Heathfield was able to make numerous acquaintances. In particular, he was familiar with Leon Fuerth, a former National Security Advisor to Vice President Al Gore, and professor of management at George Washington University, William Halal, who participated in the 2008 World Future Society conference. Halal described his relationship with Heathfield as warm. "I came across him at meetings in federal agencies, thought factories, and the World Future Society. I do not know anything that could be of interest from a security perspective. Everything that I provided to Don was published and available via the Internet. "

Bezrukov and his wife lived in Cambridge, Massachusetts. Around that time, Elena Vavilova had graduated from McGill University and, before settling in the United States, had lived in France. She worked at the Redfin real estate agency in Somerville, Massachusetts.

In June 2010 he was arrested in the United States along with his wife as part of an undercover operation. On July 9, 2010, he was exchanged with four other Russian citizens, along with 9 other Russian illegal intelligence agents in Vienna. Among the exchanged was Sergei Skripal, who had been in a Russian prison for 13 years for passing information to MI6.

After returning to Russia, Bezrukov and his wife were awarded the Order "For Merit to the Fatherland" 4th Class. He was also appointed adviser to the president of Rosneft, as well as an assistant professor at the Department of Applied Analysis of International Problems at MGIMO. In 2015, he published the book Russia and the World in 2020. The contours of a troubled future. After his return, he gave his first interview to the Russian Reporter magazine in 2012. He has also given several other interviews in local media. Today, he regularly leads a column in the business newspaper Izvestia on current topics. As of August 2019, Bezrukov was continuing his teaching career and doing consulting work for an oil company while Vavilova "also has a consultancy role at a company", according to The Guardian.

Tracey Foley

Elena Stanislavovna Vavilova; born November 16, 1962), often referred to by her cover name Tracey Foley, is a former KGB sleeper agent. She was born in Tomsk, then part of the Soviet Union, to parents Stanislav Platonovich Vavilov and Svetlana Konstantinovna Vavilova. From 1970 to 1980, she attended a school where she learned German. In 1985, she graduated from Tomsk State University with a degree in history via a distance learning program. While studying there, she met her future husband. After they married, they moved to Moscow to begin their training as KGB officers.

Since the late 1980s, for almost 25 years she worked as a deep-cover intelligence officer in several countries under the name of Tracy Lee Ann Foley. Her husband, Andrey Bezrukov, worked with her under the assumed name of Donald Howard Heathfield. According to her undercover identity, Foley was born in Canada. While living in Toronto she gave birth to two sons: Timothy (born 1990) and Alexander (born 1994).

In 1999, the family settled in Cambridge, Massachusetts. Vavilova, known as Ann Foley, worked as a real estate agent, first at Channing Real Estate and later for another real estate company ⁠— Redfin. Her former employer described her as “one of the hardest working and most competent agents” he had.

On June 27, 2010, after a decade of surveillance, Vavilova and her husband were arrested at their Cambridge townhouse as part of an operation carried out by US surveillance agencies. They were then released to Russian authorities as part of a prisoner exchange in Vienna. Upon returning to Russia, she and her husband were given the Order "For Merit to the Fatherland" 4th Class.

She currently lives in Moscow with her husband, and has since become a writer. The family served as the inspiration for the main characters in the TV show The Americans.
In 2019 Vavilova published in Russian her first spy fiction novel A Woman Who Can Keep Secrets written together with Andrey Bronnikov, a special forces veteran. It offers a rare glimpse into the training of the Soviet illegals, including evading surveillance, coding messages, studying maps and cryptography, learning foreign languages, establishing a cover story and performing missions abroad to collect intelligence. The book was presented at the press conference of the largest Russian news agency TASS. Following the book release, Vavilova gave many interviews and appeared on a number of top Russian television and radio programs.
Her autobiographical novel was translated into Bulgarian. In 2021 it was translated to Catalan and Spanish and published by Simbol Editors and Roca-editorial. Translation was done by Josep Lluis Alay.

In 2021 Elena Vavilova published her second novel in Russian “The Encrypted Heart” that tells a story of a female Russian illegal sent on a mission to Hong Kong under the name of Stella Lei and her love affair with a French man. 
Elena often gives lectures within youth organizations and conducts seminars on leadership and networking. Together with her husband she developed the course “Strategic Networking” that they teach at the prestigious “Orator Club” in Moscow.

Heathfield and Foley children
The Heathfield and Foley children maintained that they never knew their parents were Russian spies and never heard them speak in Russian. At the time of their parents' arrest, they were 16 and 20 years old. Their Canadian citizenship was revoked on the grounds that the children of foreign diplomats are not entitled to citizenship even if born on Canadian soil. The younger son, Alex, appealed the decision and ultimately had his citizenship reinstated.

Notes

1960 births
Living people
People from Kansk
Recipients of the Order "For Merit to the Fatherland"
Russian spies
Soviet spies
Foreign Intelligence Service (Russia) officers
Tomsk State University alumni
Harvard Kennedy School alumni